Vula first appeared in Cape Town in December 1984. Distributed to beach bathers and the like, it quickly became one of the country's top, alternative publications, before disappearing sometime in 1987.

Other SA Alternative Publications
 Kagenna

See also
Alternative Press
Alternative Media
Underground Press
Samizdat
Self publishing

References

1984 establishments in South Africa
1987 disestablishments in South Africa
Alternative magazines
Defunct magazines published in South Africa
Magazines established in 1984
Magazines disestablished in 1987
Mass media in Cape Town